Tanguy Nef (born 19 November 1996) is a Swiss alpine skier. 

He is a member of Swiss Ski's A frame for the 2021-2022 season.

Early life and career 
Tanguy Nef started skiing when he was 6 years old on the slopes of the Valais central in French-speaking Switzerland, following in the footsteps of his family members. Son of a Swiss ski teacher, he started competing in alpine ski racing in the cadet/mini category at the age of 7.

In 2016, shortly after his first podiums in FIS slalom, he competed in his first European Cup events then took part in his first Junior World Championships. He then moved to the United States to study computer science at Dartmouth College where he completed a bachelor's degree.

In 2017, he competed in the North American Cup (5 top10, including 3 top5) and participated in the FIS Alpine Junior World Ski Championships in Åre.

He had his first continental successes in North American Cup events during the winter of the 2017-2018 season (6 podiums including 2 victories).

He was promoted to the World Cup for the 2018-2019 season and scored points in his first race at Levi with an 11th place in slalom, followed by a 4th place in the European Cup slalom a few days later. In January 2019, he finished 13th in Zagreb before making it to the top 30 twice in Adelboden and Schladming. He was then selected for the 2019 FIS Alpine World Ski Championships, where he finished 29th in slalom. At the end of the season, he won two giant slalom North American Cups at Burke Mountain.

During the 2019-2020 season, he scored points at Levi and Zagreb once again before securing the top 10 twice in a World Cup race in January 2020, at Madonna di Campiglio and Wengen.

He started the 2020-2021 season with the 26th position at Zürs, before succeeding in slalom, finishing 6th at Alta Badia and 18th at Madonna di Campiglio. In January 2021, he finished 6th in the Adelboden slalom which marked his best result of the season. He then finished 10th in Flachau before ending the month with two additional top 30s in Schladming and Chamonix. In March, he finished 10th in the slalom of the World Cup finals in Lenzerheide. He changed ski brand from Fischer to Head during the summer.

During the first slalom of the 2021-2022 season in Val d'Isère, he finished 4th in the initial run before being eliminated at the first gate during the second run. Despite finishing 13th in Adelboden then 24th in Wengen in January, he narrowly missed his selection for the 2022 Beijing Winter Olympics. In February, he secured his first podium in the European Cup in Almåsa. A few days later, he led the first slalom in Garmisch at the end of the first run before being eliminated in the second run. He finished 22nd  for the last race of the World Cup season at Flachau.

References

External links
 

1996 births
Living people
Swiss male alpine skiers
Sportspeople from Geneva
21st-century Swiss people